Don Schofield was an Australian professional rugby league footballer who played in the 1950s and 1960s. An Australia national and New South Wales state representative forward, he played his club football in the Newcastle Rugby League for Cessnock and in the New South Wales Rugby League for Sydney's Western Suburbs.

Schofield initially played in the Newcastle Rugby League for the Cessnock club, appearing in their grand final victory of 1950. While playing for Cessnock, he was selected to represent Newcastle when they hosted the 1951 French touring side and lost. Schofield then played in the New South Wales Rugby Football League premiership for the Western Suburbs Magpies, scoring two tries in their Grand Final win in the 1952 season and was voted man of the match winning prize money of £10. He suffered a groin injury in that match which required surgery in the off-season.

Schofield returned to Cessnock, playing in each of their Newcastle Rugby League grand finals victories of 1954, 1955 and 1960. Towards the end of his career he captained the Newcastle team against the touring Great Britain side in 1962. His son Michael Schofield played rugby league for the Balmain Tigers and the Country New South Wales team.

Don Schofield died in April 1999, aged 68.

In 2011, the Cessnock club's centenary year, Schofield was named at second-row forward in a Cessnock 'Team of the Century'.

References

External links
Past Greats at cessnockrugbyleague.com.au
Don Schofield at yesterdayshero.com.au

1931 births
1999 deaths
Australian rugby league players
Cessnock Goannas players
Rugby league second-rows
Western Suburbs Magpies players
Australia national rugby league team players
Newcastle rugby league team players
Date of birth missing
Place of birth missing
Rugby league players from Cessnock, New South Wales